Techi Kagung (born 3 October 1987) is an Indian cricketer. He made his List A debut on 1 March 2021, for Arunachal Pradesh in the 2020–21 Vijay Hazare Trophy. He made his first-class debut on 24 February 2022, for Arunachal Pradesh in the 2021–22 Ranji Trophy.

References

External links
 

1987 births
Living people
Indian cricketers
Arunachal Pradesh cricketers
Place of birth missing (living people)